Somluck Kamsing (name used in the 1996 Summer Olympics) or Somrak Kamsing (born January 16, 1973) is a Thai kickboxer and Olympic gold medal-winning amateur boxer. During the 1998 Asian Games in Bangkok, Thailand, Kamsing lit the torch during the Games' opening ceremony. Kamsing was born in Khon Kaen. His older brother Somrot Kamsing also competed at the highest level as an amateur boxer.

Amateur boxing career
Somrak started to compete in amateur boxing in parallel as his muay thai career, he earned a bronze medal at the 1989 King's Cup and a gold medal in the 1995 edition. At the 1996 Summer Olympics he won a gold medal in the men's Featherweight category, beating Ramaz Paliani and Serafim Todorov among others, becoming the first Thai athlete to win a gold medal at the Olympics.

He also competed at the 2000 and 2004 Summer Olympics without winning any medals. Kamsing placed second at the 1st AIBA Asian 2004 Olympic Qualifying Tournament in Guangzhou, China. In the final, he lost to North Korea's Kim Song-Guk. As a result of this however, he qualified for the Athens Games.

Muay Thai career
At age 7, Somluck began training and fighting in Muay Thai. At 11, he moved to Bangkok to fight in the bigger stadiums under the name Pimaranlek Sitaran (พิมพ์อรัญเล็ก ศิษย์อรัญ). Prior to switching to amateur boxing he was viewed as one of the best fighters in the sport. He didn't compete competitively in Thailand after making the switch, but he did take up the occasional fight against foreign fighters.

In 2012 he made a return to the major boxing stadiums, not as a serious fighter, but to fight other semi-retired legends in hopes of attracting people to the sport. He beat fellow legend Jomhod Kiatadisak on October 4, 2012 at Rajadamnern Stadium in a fight with the largest ever side bet in Muay Thai, 5.27 million baht on the line.

They fought again on December 7, 2012 on the Lumpinee stadium birthday show. This time Jomhod Kiatadisak won by points.

They fought third match with a 6 million baht side bet on February 7, 2013 and Somluck won again by decision.

However, he lost to American Nak Muay Chike Lindsay by unanimous decision in a modified Thai boxing Push Kick: World Stand Off in Pomona, California, on March 2, 2013.

Somluck fought to a draw with another legend, Yodwanpadet Sor Junlasen under special rules, at Rajadamnern Stadium on 2 April 2015. Somluck was only allowed to punch while Yodwanpadet could fight full Muay Thai.

Muay Thai record

|-
|- bgcolor="#CCFFCC"
| 2013-08-30 || Win ||align=left| Victor Nagbe || Toyota Muay Thai Marathon || Chonburi, Thailand || Decision || 3 || 3:00
|-
! style=background:white colspan=9 |
|-
|- bgcolor="#CCFFCC"
| 2013-08-30 || Win ||align=left| Warren Stawon || Toyota Muay Thai Marathon || Chonburi, Thailand || Decision || 3 || 3:00
|- bgcolor="#FFBBBB"
| 2013-03-02 || Loss ||align=left| Chike Lindsay || Push Kick: World Stand Off || Pomona, California, USA || Decision (unanimous) || 3 || 3:00
|- bgcolor="#CCFFCC"
| 2013-02-06 || Win ||align=left| Yodwanpadet Suwanwichit || Rajadamnern Stadium || Bangkok, Thailand || Decision || 5 || 3:00
|-  style="background:#fbb;"
| 2012-12-07 || Loss ||align=left| Jomhod Kiatadisak || Lumpinee Champion Krikkrai Fight, Lumpinee Stadium || Bangkok, Thailand || Decision || 5 || 3:00
|-
|- bgcolor="#CCFFCC"
| 2012-10-04 || Win ||align=left| Yodwanpadet Suwanwichit || Rajadamnern Stadium || Bangkok, Thailand || TKO || 3 ||
|- bgcolor="#CCFFCC"
| 2008-11-01 || Win ||align=left| Davit Kiria || K-1 Ring Masters Olympia 2008 || Istanbul, Turkey || Decision || 3 || 3:00
|-
! style=background:white colspan=9 |
|-
|- bgcolor="#CCFFCC"
| 2008-11-01 || Win ||align=left| Ajay Balgobind || K-1 Ring Masters Olympia 2008 || Istanbul, Turkey || Decision || 3 || 3:00
|- bgcolor="#CCFFCC"
| 2005-12-05 || Win ||align=left| Jowan Stringer || King's Birth Day || Sanam Luang, Bangkok, Thailand || KO (right elbow strike) || 3 ||
|- bgcolor="#c5d2ea"
| 2004-11-06 || Draw ||align=left| Hiroki Ishii || Titans 1st || Kitakyushu, Fukuoka, Japan || Decision draw || 3 || 3:00
|- bgcolor="#CCFFCC"
| 2000-12-05 || Win ||align=left| Kamel Jemel || King's Birth Day || Sanam Luang, Bangkok, Thailand || Decision (unanimous) || 5 || 3:00
|-  style="background:#cfc;"
| 1995-05-22|| Win||align=left| Suwitlek Sor.Skawrat || Lumpinee Stadium || Bangkok, Thailand || KO (High kick)|| 4 || 
|-  style="background:#cfc;"
| 1995-03-31|| Win||align=left| Changnoi Sirimongkol || Lumpinee Stadium || Bangkok, Thailand || Decision ||5  ||3:00 
|-  style="background:#fbb;"
| 1992-10-27|| Loss||align=left| Buakaw Por.Pisitchet || Lumpinee Stadium || Bangkok, Thailand || KO (Knee to the Body)|| 4 || 
|-  style="background:#cfc;"
| 1992-01-27|| Win||align=left| Chamuakpetch Haphalung || Rajadamnern Stadium || Bangkok, Thailand || Decision || 5 || 3:00
|-  style="background:#cfc;"
| 1991-08-27|| Win||align=left| Panomrung Sit Sor.Wor.Por || Lumpinee Stadium || Bangkok, Thailand || Decision || 5 || 3:00 
|-  style="background:#cfc;"
| 1991-06-11|| Win||align=left| Boonlai Sor.Thanikul || Lumpinee Stadium || Bangkok, Thailand || Decision || 5 || 3:00 
|-  style="background:#c5d2ea;"
| 1991-05-17|| Draw||align=left| Boonlai Sor.Thanikul || Lumpinee Stadium || Bangkok, Thailand || Decision || 5 || 3:00 
|-  style="background:#cfc;"
| 1991-03-26|| Win||align=left| Kukrit Sor.Nayayarm || Lumpinee Stadium || Bangkok, Thailand || Decision || 5 || 3:00 
|-  style="background:#cfc;"
| 1991-02-01|| Win||align=left| Darathong Kiatmuangtran || Lumpinee Stadium || Bangkok, Thailand || Decision || 5 || 3:00 
|-  style="background:#cfc;"
| 1991-01-22|| Win||align=left| Kukrit Sor.Nayayarm || Lumpinee Stadium || Bangkok, Thailand || Decision || 5 || 3:00

|-  style="background:#fbb;"
| 1990-11-30|| Loss ||align=left|  Panomrung Sit Sor Wor Por ||Lumpinee Stadium  || Bangkok, Thailand || Decision ||5 ||3:00 

|-  style="background:#cfc;"
| 1990-10-26|| Win||align=left| Boonlai Sor.Thanikul || Lumpinee Stadium || Bangkok, Thailand || Decision || 5 || 3:00 
  
|-  style="background:#fbb;"
| 1990-08-07|| Loss||align=left| Boonlai Sor.Thanikul || Lumpinee Stadium || Bangkok, Thailand || Decision || 5 || 3:00
|-  style="background:#cfc;"
| 1990-06-15|| Win||align=left| Namkabuan Nongkee Pahuyuth || Lumpinee Stadium || Bangkok, Thailand || Decision || 5 || 3:00
|-  style="background:#cfc;"
| 1990-03-20|| Win||align=left| Peemai Aor.Yutthanakorn || Lumpinee Stadium || Bangkok, Thailand || Decision || 5 || 3:00
|-  style="background:#cfc;"
| 1989-12-29|| Win||align=left| Dennuah Denmolee  || Lumpinee Stadium || Bangkok, Thailand || Decision || 5 || 3:00
|-  style="background:#cfc;"
| 1989-09-15|| Win||align=left| Samernoi Tor.Boonlert  || Lumpinee Stadium || Bangkok, Thailand || Decision || 5 || 3:00
|-  style="background:#cfc;"
| 1989-08-25|| Win||align=left| Sukkasem Detchaowit  || Lumpinee Stadium || Bangkok, Thailand || Decision || 5 || 3:00
|-  style="background:#cfc;"
| 1989-|| Win||align=left| Sakchai Wongwianyai  || Lumpinee Stadium || Bangkok, Thailand || Decision || 5 || 3:00 
|-  style="background:#fbb;"
| 1989-06-23 || Loss ||align=left| Chainoi Muangsurin  || Lumpinee Stadium || Bangkok, Thailand || Decision || 5 || 3:00
|-  style="background:#cfc;"
| 1989-05|| Win||align=left| Chatchainoi Chawraiaoy || Lumpinee Stadium || Bangkok, Thailand || Decision || 5 || 3:00 
|-  style="background:#fbb;"
| 1989-02-29|| Loss||align=left| Rungroj Singhlanthong || Lumpinee Stadium || Bangkok, Thailand || Decision || 5 || 3:00 
|-  style="background:#cfc;"
| 1989-|| Win||align=left| Thanongdet Kiatpayathai || Lumpinee Stadium || Bangkok, Thailand || Decision || 5 || 3:00 
|-  style="background:#cfc;"
| 1988-12-30|| Win ||align=left| King Sor.Ploenchit ||Lumpinee Stadium  || Bangkok, Thailand || Decision || 5 || 3:00 

|-  style="background:#fbb;"
| 1988-10-14 || Loss ||align=left| Chainoi Muangsurin  || Lumpinee Stadium || Bangkok, Thailand || Decision || 5 || 3:00
|-  style="background:#cfc;"
| 1988-09-20|| Win ||align=left| Warunee Sor.Ploenchit ||Lumpinee Stadium  || Bangkok, Thailand || Decision || 5 || 3:00 
|-  style="background:#cfc;"
| 1988-05-10|| Win ||align=left| Wuttichai Sor.Ploenchit ||Lumpinee Stadium  || Bangkok, Thailand || Decision || 5 || 3:00 
|-  style="background:#cfc;"
| 1988-03-22|| Win||align=left|  Panomrung Sit Sor Wor Por ||Lumpinee Stadium  || Bangkok, Thailand || Decision || 5 || 3:00
|-  style="background:#cfc;"
| 1987-|| Win||align=left| Pankao Sor.Thanikul ||Rajadamnern Stadium  || Bangkok, Thailand || Decision || 5 || 3:00 
 
|-  style="background:#fbb;"
| 1987-11-30|| Loss ||align=left| Panomrung Sit Sor Wor Por|| Lumpinee Stadium  || Bangkok, Thailand || Decision || 5 || 3:00 
|-  style="background:#cfc;"
| 1987-11-03|| Win||align=left| Samart Witthayakonsong ||Lumpinee Stadium  || Bangkok, Thailand || Decision || 5 || 3:00 
|-  style="background:#fbb;"
| 1987-|| Loss||align=left| Noppadet Narumon ||Lumpinee Stadium  || Bangkok, Thailand || Decision || 5 || 3:00
|-  style="background:#cfc;"
| 1987-09-29|| Win||align=left| Sananchai Lukmongchol ||Lumpinee Stadium  || Bangkok, Thailand || Decision || 5 || 3:00 
|-  style="background:#cfc;"
| 1987-|| Win||align=left| Sananchai Lukmongchol ||Lumpinee Stadium  || Bangkok, Thailand || Decision || 5 || 3:00 
 
|-  style="background:#cfc;"
| 1987-|| Win||align=left| Samad Pukrongfa ||Lumpinee Stadium  || Bangkok, Thailand || KO (Elbow)|| 3 ||

|-  style="background:#cfc;"
| 1987-|| Win||align=left|  Panomrung Sit Sor Wor Por ||Lumpinee Stadium  || Bangkok, Thailand || Decision || 5 || 3:00

|-  style="background:#cfc;"
| 1987- || Win||align=left| Rungroj Sor.Sakpai||Lumpinee Stadium  || Bangkok, Thailand || Decision || 5 || 3:00

|-  style="background:#cfc;"
| 1985-|| Win||align=left| Boby Chor Wigo ||Rajadamnern Stadium  || Bangkok, Thailand || Decision || 5 || 3:00

|-  style="background:#cfc;"
| 1985-|| Win||align=left| Lukjit Sitlongkyu ||Rajadamnern Stadium  || Bangkok, Thailand || Decision || 5 || 3:00

|-  style="background:#cfc;"
| 1985-|| Win||align=left| Superneng Luksamrong ||Rajadamnern Stadium  || Bangkok, Thailand || Decision || 5 || 3:00 
|-
! style=background:white colspan=9 |

|-  style="background:#cfc;"
| 1985- ||Win ||align=left| Rungruang Kiatanan || Omnoi Stadium || Samut Sakhon, Thailand || Decision || 5 ||3:00

|-  style="background:#cfc;"
| 1985- ||Win ||align=left| Kaewannoi Sor Kanokrat || Omnoi Stadium || Samu Sakhon, Thailand || KO ||  ||

|-  style="background:#cfc;"
| 1985- ||Win ||align=left| Sakmongkol Sithchuchok ||  || Bo Rai District, Thailand || Decision || 5 ||3:00

|-  style="background:#cfc;"
| 1985- ||Win ||align=left| Sutipong Sitsaenma || Rangsit Stadium || Rangsit, Thailand || Decision || 5 ||3:00

|-  style="background:#cfc;"
| 1985- ||Win ||align=left| Prasathong Singkumpha || Rangsit Stadium || Rangsit, Thailand || KO ||  ||

|-  style="background:#cfc;"
| 1985- ||Win ||align=left| Majurat Sitkrupop || Samrong Stadium || Samut Prakan, Thailand || KO ||  ||

|-  style="background:#cfc;"
| 1985- ||Win ||align=left| Dejrit Sor.Ploenchit || Samrong Stadium || Samut Prakan, Thailand || Decision || 5 ||3:00

|-  style="background:#cfc;"
| 1985- ||Win ||align=left| Rungroj Sor.Ploenchit || Samrong Stadium || Samut Prakan, Thailand || Decision || 5 ||3:00

|-  style="background:#cfc;"
| 1985- ||Win ||align=left| Lukrothong Petchriracha || Samrong Stadium || Samut Prakan, Thailand || Decision || 5 ||3:00

|-  style="background:#cfc;"
| 1985- ||Win ||align=left| Chalong Silpakorn || Samrong Stadium || Samut Prakan, Thailand || Decision || 5 ||3:00

|-  style="background:#cfc;"
| 1985- ||Win ||align=left| Saylamlek Muangrainu|| Samrong Stadium || Samut Prakan, Thailand || Decision || 5 ||3:00

|-  style="background:#cfc;"
| 1985- ||Win ||align=left| Singnoi Luksamrong || Samrong Stadium || Samut Prakan, Thailand || Decision || 5 ||3:00

|-  style="background:#cfc;"
| 1985- ||Win ||align=left| Pichit Charoenpak || || Chonburi, Thailand ||Decision || 5 ||3:00
|-  style="background:#cfc;"
| 1985- ||Win ||align=left| Sorapong Por Pongsawang || || Khon Kaen Province, Thailand || Decision|| 5 ||3:00 
|-
| colspan=9 | Legend:

Amateur boxing record (incomplete)

|- bgcolor="#FFBBBB"
| 2004-08-16 || Loss ||align=left| Benoit Gaudet || 2004 Summer Olympics Featherweight Round of 32 || Athens, Greece || Points (17:32) || 4 || 2:00
|- bgcolor="#CCFFCC"
| 2002-04 || Win ||align=left| Takashi Uchiyama || 25th King's Cup International Amateur Boxing Tournament, Lightweight Semi-final || Thailand || Points || 4 || 2:00
|- bgcolor="#FFBBBB"
| 2000-08 || Loss ||align=left| Rocky Juarez || 2000 Summer Olympics Featherweight Quarterfinal || Sydney, Australia || RSC || 4 ||
|- bgcolor="#CCFFCC"
| 2000-08 || Win ||align=left| Tulkunbay Turgunov || 2000 Summer Olympics Featherweight Round of 16 || Sydney, Australia || Points (7:2) || 4 || 2:00
|- bgcolor="#CCFFCC"
| 2000-08 || Win ||align=left| Andres Ledesma || 2000 Summer Olympics Featherweight Round of 32 || Sydney, Australia || RSC || 4 ||
|- bgcolor="#CCFFCC"
| 1996 || Win ||align=left| Serafim Todorov || 1996 Summer Olympics Featherweight Final || Atlanta, United States || Points (8:5) || 4 || 2:00
|- 
! style=background:white colspan=9 |
|-
|- bgcolor="#CCFFCC"
| 1996 || Win ||align=left| Pablo Chacón || 1996 Summer Olympics Featherweight Semifinal || Atlanta, United States || Points (20:8) || 4 || 2:00
|- bgcolor="#CCFFCC"
| 1996 || Win ||align=left| Ramaz Paliani || 1996 Summer Olympics Featherweight Quarterfinal || Atlanta, United States || Points (13:4) || 4 || 2:00
|- bgcolor="#CCFFCC"
| 1996 || Win ||align=left| Phillip Ndou || 1996 Summer Olympics Featherweight Round of 16 || Atlanta, United States || Points (12:7) || 4 || 2:00
|- bgcolor="#CCFFCC"
| 1996 || Win ||align=left| Luis Seda || 1996 Summer Olympics Featherweight Round of 32 || Atlanta, United States || Points (13:2) || 4 || 2:00
|- bgcolor="#CCFFCC"
| 1994-10 || Win ||align=left| Zaigham Maseel || 1994 Asian Games, Boxing Featherweight Final || Hiroshima, Japan || Points (8:5) || 4 || 2:00
|- 
! style=background:white colspan=9 |
|-
|- bgcolor="#FFBBBB"
| 1992 || Loss ||align=left| Faustino Reyes || 1992 Summer Olympics Featherweight Second Round || Barcelona, Spain || Points (15:24) || 4 || 2:00
|- bgcolor="#CCFFCC"
| 1992 || Win ||align=left| Michael Strange || 1992 Summer Olympics Featherweight First Round || Barcelona, Spain || Points (11:9) || 4 || 2:00
|-
| colspan=9 | Legend:

Movie career
He has later played athletic roles in Thai movies, notably Kerd ma lui.
He appeared in Fearless with Jet Li, although his scene was cut from the international release of the film. However, a special version was shown in cinemas in Thailand in March 2006, in which his scene was restored. He portrayed a boxer who challenges Jet Li's character.
He was seen recently on screens playing a Muay Thai trainer in A Prayer Before Dawn.

Singing career
He also made his debut as a singer in 2006, performing at the Pattaya Music Festival and releasing an album and a music video (featuring fellow boxer Khaosai Galaxy as a shy man being approached by a young woman).

Filmography

Dramas

Series

Sitcom

Film

Advertising

References

External links
 
 

1973 births
Living people
Somluck Kamsing
Somluck Kamsing
Somluck Kamsing
Boxers at the 1992 Summer Olympics
Boxers at the 1996 Summer Olympics
Boxers at the 2000 Summer Olympics
Boxers at the 2004 Summer Olympics
Somluck Kamsing
Olympic medalists in boxing
Asian Games medalists in boxing
Somluck Kamsing
Boxers at the 1994 Asian Games
Boxers at the 1998 Asian Games
Somluck Kamsing
Medalists at the 1996 Summer Olympics
Somluck Kamsing
Medalists at the 1994 Asian Games
Medalists at the 1998 Asian Games
Southeast Asian Games medalists in boxing
Somluck Kamsing
Competitors at the 1995 Southeast Asian Games
Featherweight boxers
Somluck Kamsing